Penrhosfeilw is a village in the community of Trearddur, Ynys Môn, Wales, which is 140.1 miles (225.4 km) from Cardiff and 227.5 miles (366.1 km) from London.

References

See also 
 List of localities in Wales by population 

Villages in Anglesey